Skrjabinoclava is a genus of nematodes belonging to the family Acuariidae.

The species of this genus are found in America.

Species:
Skrjabinoclava aculeata 
Skrjabinoclava albae 
Skrjabinoclava alii 
Skrjabinoclava amaurornae 
Skrjabinoclava andersoni 
Skrjabinoclava bakeri 
Skrjabinoclava bartlettae 
Skrjabinoclava brevispicula 
Skrjabinoclava cincli 
Skrjabinoclava decorata 
Skrjabinoclava deltensis 
Skrjabinoclava halcyoni 
Skrjabinoclava hartwichi 
Skrjabinoclava horrida 
Skrjabinoclava inornatae 
Skrjabinoclava kinsellai 
Skrjabinoclava kristjani 
Skrjabinoclava kritscheri 
Skrjabinoclava longifuniculata 
Skrjabinoclava morrisoni 
Skrjabinoclava myersi 
Skrjabinoclava pusillae 
Skrjabinoclava rallae 
Skrjabinoclava sealyi 
Skrjabinoclava semipalmatae 
Skrjabinoclava skulasoni 
Skrjabinoclava snorrasoni 
Skrjabinoclava solonitzini 
Skrjabinoclava soricis 
Skrjabinoclava thapari 
Skrjabinoclava tupacincai 
Skrjabinoclava venusta 
Skrjabinoclava vogurensis 
Skrjabinoclava wilsoniae

References

Nematodes